Hileithia decostalis is a moth in the family Crambidae. It was described by Achille Guenée in 1854. It is found in Brazil, Venezuela, the Virgin Islands, Jamaica and Costa Rica. It has also been recorded from the southern United States, where it is only known from Mississippi.

References

Moths described in 1854
Spilomelinae